The Sun Odyssey 29.2 is a French sailboat that was designed by Jacques Fauroux as a family cruiser and first built in 1997.

Production
The design was built by Jeanneau in France, from 1997 to 2008 with 832 boats completed, but it is now out of production.

Design
The Sun Odyssey 29.2 is a recreational keelboat, built predominantly of polyester fiberglass, with wood trim. The hull is solid fiberglass, while the deck is a fiberglass-balsa sandwich. It has a fractional sloop rig, with a deck-stepped mast, a single set of swept spreaders and aluminum spars with continuous stainless steel wire rigging. The hull has a raked stem, a reverse transom, an internally mounted spade-type rudder controlled by a tiller and a fixed fin keel or optional stub keel and steel centerboard. The fin keel model displaces  and carries  of cast iron ballast, while the centerboard version displaces  and carries  of exterior cast iron ballast.

The design has sleeping accommodation for six people, with a double "V"-berth in the bow cabin, two straight settees in the main cabin and an aft cabin with a double berth on the port side. The galley is located on the port side just forward of the companionway ladder. The galley is "L"-shaped and is equipped with a two-burner stove, an ice box and a double sink. A navigation station is opposite the galley, on the starboard side. The head is located just aft of the bow cabin on the starboard side.

See also
List of sailing boat types

References

External links

Keelboats
1990s sailboat type designs
Sailing yachts
Sailboat type designs by Jacques Fauroux
Sailboat types built by Jeanneau